The Lola T490 is a 2-litre Group 5 Sports 2000 prototype race car, designed, developed and built by British manufacturer Lola, for 2-litre sports car racing, in 1977.

References

Sports prototypes
T490